The former Royal Air Force Rheindahlen, more commonly known as RAF Rheindahlen, was a non-flying Royal Air Force (RAF) military administrative base, becoming part of the Rheindahlen Military Complex (JHQ Rheindahlen) in North Rhine-Westphalia, Germany; collectively a part of British Forces Germany (BFG).  The Royal Air Force station was named after the nearby town and railway station of Rheindahlen.  In the 1950s and 1960s, it was more commonly referred to as RAF Mönchengladbach; due to Rheindahlen being the Army's name for the same JHQ.  It was unusual in that the RAF station land was publicly accessible, with public transport routes, and even German civilian mail service (Rheindahlen 2).

History
RAF Rheindahlen was established shortly after the headquarters of RAF Second Tactical Air Force (2TAF) moved from RAF Bad Eilsen when Joint Headquarters Rheindahlen opened in October 1954.  It served mainly as the administrative support centre for the headquarters of Second Tactical Air Force until 1 January 1959, when it then became the headquarters of Royal Air Force Germany (HQ RAFG).

The Station Headquarters (SHQ) for RAF Rheindahlen was located on the south side of Queens Avenue, in a crescent of three buildings (nos 139, 141 and 143), with the RAF flagstaff on the small lawn in front.  Most of the RAF Rheindahlen units (messes, billets, mechanical transport (MT), stores, medical and dental centre, and sports facilities) were located in the same area of Joint Headquarters Rheindahlen, though the many elements occupying JHQ were not confined to specific areas.

No. 11 Signals Unit (11 SU) was located at RAF Rheindahlen from 1 June 1975 to 31 December 1980.

Closure
On the same day, 1 April 1993, No. 2 Group RAF set up headquarters at the then former RAF Rheindahlen, HQ 2 Gp remaining there until . After the disbandment of RAF Rheindahlen in 1993, all remaining RAF Rheindahlen facilities were subsequently amalgamated with and occupied by the existing British Army garrison, as HQ United Kingdom Support Command (Germany), the entire area becoming known as the Rheindahlen Military Complex. On , all existing British military units left the base, and the whole Rheindahlen Military Complex was officially handed over to the German federal authorities on the same day.

Main units

See also

RAF Hospital Wegberg — the Royal Air Force hospital created nearby to serve RAF Rheindahlen and other nearby British military establishments
List of former Royal Air Force stations

References

External links

British Army in Germany — via Archive.org

Royal Air Force stations in Germany
Barracks in Germany
Buildings and structures in Mönchengladbach
Military installations closed in 1993